"Singing My Song" is a song recorded by American country music artist Tammy Wynette, who co-wrote the song with Billy Sherrill and Glenn Sutton.  It was released in March 1969 as the first single from her compilation album Tammy's Greatest Hits. The song was Wynette's fifth number one on the country charts as a solo artist.  The single spent two weeks at number one and a total of fourteen weeks on the charts.

Chart performance

Cover versions
 In 1970, Vikki Carr peaked at number thirty on the Easy Listening chart with her recording of the song.

References
 

1969 singles
Tammy Wynette songs
Songs written by Billy Sherrill
Songs written by Glenn Sutton
Song recordings produced by Billy Sherrill
Vikki Carr songs
Epic Records singles
Tammy Wynette albums
1969 songs